José Bono Martínez (born 14 December 1950) is a politician of the Spanish Socialist Workers' Party (PSOE). He served as President of the Congress of Deputies during the 9th Legislature. Before that, he was the Minister of Defence of Spain from 18 April 2004 in the Government chaired by José Luis Rodríguez Zapatero. He left his ministerial post on 7 April 2006 and was replaced by former Minister of Interior, José Antonio Alonso. Bono had previously served as President of the Autonomous Community of Castile-La Mancha from 6 June 1983 to 17 April 2004. In 2020, he was granted Dominican Republic citizenship by means of a presidential decree.

Minister of Defence 

During his cabinet spell, José Bono was involved in certain controversial events, some of them regarding his role as Minister of Defence (e.g. the controversy created by the public declarations of Lt. General  about the 1978 Spanish Constitution, defending the possibility of an intervention of the armed forces to maintain the territorial integrity of Spain), and others regarding his membership of the Socialist Workers' Party, the most significant of them being the detention of two members of the Popular Party (PP) who were participating with him in a popular demonstration, after they had allegedly attempted to assault him. He was elected President of the Congress of Deputies on 1 April 2008.

See also
 History of Spain
 Politics of Spain
 Prime Minister of Spain

References

External links
Official website (in Spanish)

|-

|-

1950 births
Living people
People from the Province of Albacete
People's Socialist Party (Spain) politicians
Spanish Socialist Workers' Party politicians
Presidents of the Congress of Deputies (Spain)
Presidents of Castilla–La Mancha
Defence ministers of Spain
Members of the 1st Cortes of Castilla–La Mancha
Members of the 2nd Cortes of Castilla–La Mancha
Members of the 3rd Cortes of Castilla–La Mancha
Members of the 4th Cortes of Castilla–La Mancha
Members of the 5th Cortes of Castilla–La Mancha
Members of the 6th Cortes of Castilla–La Mancha
Members of the Cortes of Castilla–La Mancha from Albacete
Members of the Cortes of Castilla–La Mancha from Toledo
Spanish nationalists